Smithburg is an unincorporated community in Doddridge County in the U.S. state of West Virginia. It is located along U.S. Route 50. Middle Island Creek, the longest stream in West Virginia to be named a "creek," is formed in Smithburg by the confluence of Meathouse Fork and Buckeye Creek.  The North Bend Rail Trail passes through the community.

References 

Unincorporated communities in Doddridge County, West Virginia
Unincorporated communities in West Virginia
Clarksburg micropolitan area